Wagneriana is a genus of orb-weaver spiders first described by F. O. Pickard-Cambridge in 1904.

Species
 it contains twenty-nine species:
Wagneriana acrosomoides (Mello-Leitão, 1939) – Colombia to Brazil
Wagneriana alma Levi, 1991 – Brazil
Wagneriana atuna Levi, 1991 – Cuba, Costa Rica to Paraguay
Wagneriana carinata F. O. Pickard-Cambridge, 1904 – Guatemala
Wagneriana cobella Levi, 1991 – Colombia, Venezuela
Wagneriana dimastophora (Mello-Leitão, 1940) – Brazil
Wagneriana eldorado Levi, 1991 – Argentina
Wagneriana hassleri Levi, 1991 – Brazil, Guyana
Wagneriana huanca Levi, 1991 – Peru
Wagneriana jacaza Levi, 1991 – Colombia, Brazil
Wagneriana jelskii (Taczanowski, 1873) – Trinidad to Bolivia
Wagneriana juquia Levi, 1991 – Brazil, Paraguay, Argentina
Wagneriana lechuza Levi, 1991 – Peru, Brazil
Wagneriana madrejon Levi, 1991 – Paraguay
Wagneriana maseta Levi, 1991 – Colombia to Ecuador and Brazil
Wagneriana neblina Levi, 1991 – Venezuela
Wagneriana pakitza Levi, 1991 – Peru
Wagneriana roraima Levi, 1991 – Brazil
Wagneriana silvae Levi, 1991 – Peru, Bolivia
Wagneriana spicata (O. Pickard-Cambridge, 1889) – Mexico to Costa Rica
Wagneriana taboga Levi, 1991 – Panama to Venezuela, Brazil
Wagneriana taim Levi, 1991 – Brazil
Wagneriana tauricornis (O. Pickard-Cambridge, 1889) (type) – USA to Peru
Wagneriana tayos Levi, 1991 – Colombia to Peru
Wagneriana transitoria (C. L. Koch, 1839) – Venezuela to Argentina
Wagneriana undecimtuberculata (Keyserling, 1865) – Panama to Peru
Wagneriana vallenuevo Alayón, 2011 – Hispaniola (Dominican Rep.)
Wagneriana vegas Levi, 1991 – Cuba, Hispaniola
Wagneriana yacuma Levi, 1991 – Brazil, Bolivia

References

External links
 Wagneriana at BugGuide

Araneidae
Araneomorphae genera
Spiders of North America
Spiders of South America